Iio (written: 飯尾) is a Japanese surname. Notable people with the surname include:

, Japanese footballer
, Japanese footballer
, Japanese samurai
, Japanese samurai

Japanese-language surnames